Dave Laurion is a retired American ice hockey player and coach. He was on the coaching staff of Alaska-Fairbanks for over a decade, serving as both assistant and head coach for the varsity program.

Head coaching record

References

External links

1960 births
Alaska Nanooks men's ice hockey coaches
American ice hockey coaches
American men's ice hockey goaltenders
Ice hockey coaches from Minnesota
Living people
Notre Dame Fighting Irish men's ice hockey players
People from International Falls, Minnesota
Ice hockey players from Minnesota